Capitalism II is the sequel to the business simulation video game Capitalism. It was created by Enlight and published by Ubisoft in 2001.

The player creates and controls a business empire. This in-depth strategy game covers almost every aspect of business that could be encountered in the real world, including marketing, manufacturing, purchasing, importing and retailing. It has two new campaigns (Capitalist Campaign and Entrepreneur Campaign) plus an in-depth tutorial.

The gameplay is very similar to the original version. One noticeable difference from Capitalism I is that there are fewer products derived from agricultural resources.

Capitalism II will run on modern versions of Microsoft Windows whereas the previous versions would not.

Capitalism II has also been ported to Mac OS X by Virtual Programming.

A new expanded version of Capitalism II, called Capitalism Lab, was released on December 14, 2012. Capitalism Lab has many new features, improvements and a new concept of challenge games.

Subsequently, the following DLCs have been released for Capitalism Lab : Subsidiary DLC in 2014, City Economic Simulation DLC  in 2016, Digital Age DLC in 2018, and Banking and Finance DLC  in 2020.

Reception

The game received "favorable" reviews according to the review aggregation website Metacritic.

References

External links
 Official Capitalism II site
 Official Capitalism Lab site
 Official Capitalism II and Capitalism Lab Forum
 

2001 video games
Business simulation games
MacOS games
Multiplayer and single-player video games
Ubisoft games
Video game sequels
Video games developed in Hong Kong
Video games scored by Bjørn Lynne
Video games featuring protagonists of selectable gender
Windows games